The Aguanaval River is a river located in northeastern Mexico.

Geography
It originates in the southern Sierra Madre Occidental range of Zacatecas state, and flows generally north through Zacatecas and Durango states to empty into the endorheic Bolsón de Mapimí, in Coahuila state.

Use
The Aguanaval River water is withdrawn and used extensively for irrigation in the Laguna Region of Durango and Coahuila.

See also
List of longest rivers of Mexico
List of rivers of Mexico

Rivers of the Sierra Madre Occidental
Rivers of Zacatecas
Rivers of Durango
Rivers of Coahuila